Demant A/S is an international hearing health care company within hearing aids, audiometric equipment, and personal communication.

History 

The Demant Group was founded in 1904 by Hans Demant, under the name Oticon. After his death in 1910, his son William Demant took over.

Already before World War I, Oticon increased its sales volume to cover Scandinavia and Saint Petersburg. In the twenties and thirties, a network of agents was established in Europe.

During World War II, Oticon started its own production due to the scarcity of goods from other countries.

In 1957, William and his wife Ida Emilie donated the Demant family's shares in the company to the Oticon Foundation which is today called The William Demant Foundation. The Foundation's general aim is charity with particular emphasis on helping people with a hearing impairment and today the Oticon Foundation is the main shareholder in William Demant Holding A/S with a holding of app. 61%.

During the 1990s the company expanded further, buying the Swiss hearing aid manufacturer Bernafon, Phonic Ear, the headset manufacturer DanaCom and Interacoustics.

In 1995 the company was listed at the Copenhagen Stock Exchange. In 1997, it was decided to change the name of the parent company from Oticon Holding A/S to William Demant Holding A/S because it was considered disadvantageous to use the same name, both for the Group, and for one of its businesses. Further in 2019 William Demant Holding A/S changed its name to Demant A/S

In February 2017 it was announced that former President & CEO Niels Jacobsen would step down after 25 years in charge of the company. Instead, he would become CEO of William Demant Invest A/S.  the company is led by President & CEO, Søren Nielsen and board chairman Niels B. Christiansen.

Demant is headquartered in Smørum northwest of Copenhagen and had sales of DKK 13.9 billion in 2018.

In April 2022, Demant announced it had agreed to sell Oticon Medical to Australian company Cochlear Limited for DKK850 million and would exit the hearing implant business.

In June 2022, Demant acquired Chinese retailer ShengWang at a cost of RMB 1.8 billion.

Business units 
Today the company focuses on three separate business units:

 Hearing aids
 Oticon, Bernafon, Sonic Innovations, Neurelec (cochlear implants, being divested) and Oticon Medical (bone anchored hearing aids)
 Audiologist / Hearing aid sales
 Audika (Australia, Germany, Denmark, France, Hungary, Italy, New Zeland, Poland, Spain, Sweden, Switzerland)
 Telex (Brazil)
 Hearing Life (Canada, United States of America)
 SWTL (China)
 Acoustica Medica (Greece, Portugal)
 Hidden Hearing (Ireland, United Kingdom)
 MTHA (Japan)
 Hearing Partners (Malaysia, Singapore)
 Van Boxtel (Luxembourg)
 Idis (Turkey)
 Medton-Hedim (Israel)
 Diagnostic instruments
 Maico Diagnostics, Interacoustics, Amplivox, Grason-Stadler, and MedRx, Inc.
 Personal communication
 Phonic Ear, Sennheiser Communications (defunct), EPOS
 Instrument dealers
 Gordon Stowe & Associates Inc., Northeastern Technologies Group Inc., Midlantic Technologies Group Inc.

References

External links
 

Health care companies of Denmark
Electronics companies of Denmark
Otorhinolaryngology organizations
Companies listed on Nasdaq Copenhagen
Danish companies established in 1904
Danish brands
Companies based in Egedal Municipality
Technology companies based in Copenhagen
Health care companies established in 1904
Hearing aid manufacturers